Almon Glenn Braswell (March 11, 1943 – October 28, 2006) was a convicted felon American business owner who founded Gero Vita International Inc. He is most noted for being one of the 140 people pardoned in the Bill Clinton pardons controversy of January 2001.

Education
Glenn Braswell attended the University of Montevallo in Alabama (then called Alabama College) from 1961-1965. Braswell was an average student, but excelled in mathematics and was voted into honorary mathematics society, Kappa Mu Epsilon. An easy going individual and well-liked by all his peers, he graduated with average grade of B.  Braswell was a very health conscious person for that period.  He was also a muscle builder and an avid tennis player and could always be seen working out in the athletic fields of the university.

Early career
After graduation, Braswell went to work in 1965 for the U.S. Navy Mine Defense in Panama City, Florida Laboratory (now called Naval Surface Warfare Systems – Panama City).  See the picture from The Underseer of July 16, 1965, for his hire-in ID.  On January 23, 1967, he left the Navy job to hire in to Lockheed-Georgia Company in Marietta, Georgia, as a programmer.

Head Start Vitamin Company

Braswell started having minor health problems which he felt was leading to excessive hair loss. It is not clear whether he had a medical condition or just self-perception that he was losing hair thus affecting his good looks.  He started doing basic search for a cure, but was not able to find one.  Consulting with several doctors, the best course of action recommended to him was to take several types of vitamins.  In his words, all the vitamins recommended would choke a horse in a single dose.  Therefore, he started to search for an alternative by consulting with pharmacists who offered to custom make vitamins for him. Driven by his own needs, Braswell commissioned the vitamin which he felt would cure his growing baldness.  Braswell also felt that his hair loss problem was not unique and started a company to sell this remedy advertising on TV Guide.   Response from TV Guide ads were beyond expectations and Braswell started a company, Cosvetics laboratory, to sell Head Start vitamin on the side.  With his background as a programmer, he kept meticulous records of his customers.  As profits grew, he quit his programming job with Lockheed on January 5, 1970, and started a full-time career in vitamin sales writing his own ad for TV Guide. Sales grew quickly and Braswell expanded into other health vitamins such as Ginseng and other trace vitamins not in the mainstream at that time. He advertised on local television in Atlanta which brought in immediate sales with each running of the ads.  With such heavy responses, Braswell set up a telesales staff geared to accept orders during the advertisements.  In retrospect, the operation is very similar to today's infomercial TV programs.  As a programmer, Braswell realized early on that the volume of responses was beyond an index card system and rented an IBM System 3 computer to store customer information.  The computer system later was expanded into a mainframe Univac.  Business continued to expand and Cosvetics Laboratory continued to add products and started a health magazine geared to articles that would support the sales of its product lines.  It also bought customer lists from New York-based advertising agencies from which it began to send direct mail and recorded sales responses into its database.  For the period in the mid-1970s Braswell had one of the most sophisticated customer/advertisement databases in America.  In 1976 the FCC allowed broadcaster Ted Turner to take his Atlanta station nationwide.  With it Cosvetics Lab became the first direct sale company that was able to access the entire national TV audience.

Criminal charges
While the ads did not claim to be a cure for hair loss, it was considered by the FDA as bordering on, if not outright fraudulent.  During the 1960s the FDA wielded absolute power and considered Head Start Vitamins to be fraudulent products.  Since Head Start Vitamins did not break any laws outright, i.e. the ingredients in the vitamin were legal for consumption, the advertising did not claim to be a 100% cure and preceded with a "pattern baldness" disclaimer, there was nothing the FDA could do.  Taking a lesson from Al Capone and the prohibition days, the US Attorney General pressed tax fraud charges against Braswell.  Curiously Cosvetics Laboratory was not directly charged.  Braswell was sent to minimum security prison in Kentucky for 3 years.

Unsubstantiated treatment for baldness
In 1983, Braswell was convicted of mail fraud and perjury in relation to false claims about a baldness treatment and sentenced to three years in federal prison. He was later pardoned by President Bill Clinton in January 2001, on Clinton's last day in office. It was later revealed that Clinton's brother-in-law Hugh Rodham had been paid $200,000 by Braswell to lobby for the pardon. Rodham eventually returned the money.

During the 1990s, Braswell operated out of Canada, using the Gero Vita brand.

IRS and FTC investigations
In 2003, Braswell was arrested again and charged with owing the Internal Revenue Service $10.5 million in taxes. Under a plea agreement, Braswell received an 18-month prison sentence. His company Gero Vita has also been taken to court by the Federal Trade Commission. His activities have been documented for many years by Stephen Barrett of Quackwatch.

Death
Braswell (at age 63) was found dead Saturday, October 28, 2006, in his Miami Beach condominium by his employees.  In a statement released a few days later, his brother Rod Braswell said he thought his brother had been poisoned. Rod Braswell also said his dead brother would join his mother and be cryogenically frozen in hopes science can return him to life one day.

See also

 List of people pardoned or granted clemency by the president of the United States

References

1943 births
2006 deaths
Braswell, Almon Glenn
People convicted for health fraud
Medical controversies in the United States
Braswell, Almon Glenn
20th-century American criminals
University of Montevallo alumni